The Bogotá Colombia Temple is the 57th operating temple of the Church of Jesus Christ of Latter-day Saints (LDS Church).

History
Ground was broken for the Bogotá Colombia Temple on June 26, 1993, by William R. Bradford.

Fifteen years passed from the time the announcement of the Bogotá Colombia Temple in 1984 to its dedication in 1999. The temple was dedicated on April 24, 1999, by LDS Church president Gordon B. Hinckley.

The Bogotá Colombia Temple is ten miles (16 km) from downtown Bogotá, in the Niza section. The building features tall stained glass windows and silver-gray Brazilian granite on the exterior. It also has marble finishes and motifs reminiscent of ancient Incan designs. The temple grounds are landscaped with plants and flowers that are native to Colombia, as well as flowering eucalyptus trees.

In 2020, the Bogotá Colombia Temple was closed temporarily during the year in response to the coronavirus pandemic.

See also

 Comparison of temples of The Church of Jesus Christ of Latter-day Saints
 List of temples of The Church of Jesus Christ of Latter-day Saints
 List of temples of The Church of Jesus Christ of Latter-day Saints by geographic region
 Temple architecture (Latter-day Saints)
 The Church of Jesus Christ of Latter-day Saints in Colombia

Additional reading

References

External links
Bogotá Colombia Temple Official site 
Bogotá Colombia Temple at ChurchofJesusChristTemples.org

20th-century Latter Day Saint temples
Buildings and structures in Bogotá
Religious buildings and structures in Colombia
Temples (LDS Church) completed in 1999
Temples (LDS Church) in South America
Temples in Colombia
The Church of Jesus Christ of Latter-day Saints in Colombia
1999 establishments in Colombia